The Do Ab prison is a prison in Panjshir, Afghanistan.
The International Committee of the Red Cross reported 270 captives held in the prison were released on January 3, 2002.
They reported that some of the captives had been held in the prison for as long as six years.

Individuals reported to have been held in the Panjshir prison

See also 
 List of prisons in Afghanistan

References